Churches dedicated to Our Lady of Mount Carmel include the following:

Chile
Our Lady of Mount Carmel Cathedral, Puerto Montt
Military Cathedral of Our Lady of Mount Carmel, Santiago

China
Church of Our Lady of Mount Carmel, Beijing
Our Lady of Mount Carmel Church (Hong Kong)

Columbia
Our Lady of Mount Carmel Cathedral, La Dorada

India
Church of Our Lady of Mount Carmel, Bandra
Our Lady of Mount Carmel Church, B Pallipatti, Tamil Nadu

Ireland
 Church of Our Lady of Mount Carmel, or Whitefriar Street Carmelite Church, Dublin

Italy 
 Santa Maria del Carmine, several churches with that name

Malta
 Carmelite Church, Balluta
 Our Lady of Mount Carmel Parish Church, Fgura
 Parish Church of Our Lady of Mount Carmel, Fleur-de-Lys
 Carmelite Parish Church, Gżira
 Basilica of Our Lady of Mount Carmel, Valletta

Philippines
Our Lady of Mount Carmel Parish Church (Pulong Buhangin)
Our Lady of Mount Carmel Church (Quezon City)

Russia
Our Lady of Mount Carmel Church, Gatchina

Spain
Shrine of Our Lady of Mount Carmel (Los Realejos)

United Kingdom
Church of Our Lady of Mount Carmel, Lampeter, Wales
Our Lady of Mount Carmel and St Patrick Church, Oldham, England
Our Lady of Mount Carmel Roman Catholic Church, Liverpool, England

United States
St. Mary's Church-Our Lady of Mount Carmel Catholic Church, Temple, Arizona
Our Lady of Mount Carmel Church (Denver, Colorado), on the National Register of Historic Places listings in west Denver
Our Lady of Mount Carmel Church (East Boston, Massachusetts)
St. Mary, Our Lady of Mount Carmel Cathedral (Gaylord, Michigan)
Our Lady of Mount Carmel Church, in the Our Lady of the Scapular Parish in Wyandotte, Michigan
Our Lady of Mount Carmel Church (Bronx)
Church of Our Lady of Mount Carmel (Manhattan)
Church of Our Lady of the Scapular of Mount Carmel, Manhattan
Shrine Church of Our Lady of Mount Carmel; a church in the Roman Catholic Diocese of Brooklyn
Our Lady of Mount Carmel's Church (Poughkeepsie, New York)
Our Lady of Mt. Carmel (Bayonne, New Jersey) 
Basilica of Our Lady of Mount Carmel (Youngstown, Ohio)
Basilica of the National Shrine of the Little Flower, San Antonio, Texas
Our Lady of Mount Carmel Cathedral (Northern Mariana Islands), in Chalan Kanoa
Our Lady of Mount Carmel Church, Cruz Bay, Virgin Islands

Uruguay
Nuestra Señora del Carmen, Aguada, Montevideo
Nuestra Señora del Carmen, Cordón, Montevideo
Virgen del Carmen y Santa Teresita, Montevideo

Venezuela 
Our Lady of Mount Carmel Cathedral, Guasdualito

See also
 Our Lady of Mount Carmel Cathedral (disambiguation)
 Our Lady of Mount Carmel (disambiguation)
 Santa Maria del Carmine (disambiguation)
 Carmine Church (disambiguation)
 Church of Our Lady (disambiguation)
 Our Lady of Mount Carmel Grotto, Staten Island, New York

Church